Mario Zanchi (8 May 1939 – 20 April 1976) was an Italian racing cyclist. He rode in the 1962 Tour de France.

References

External links
 

1939 births
1976 deaths
Italian male cyclists
Sportspeople from the Province of Arezzo
Cyclists from Tuscany